Connecticut's 35th House of Representatives district elects one member of the Connecticut House of Representatives. It consists of the towns of Clinton, Killingworth, and parts of Westbrook. It has been represented by Republican Chris Aniskovich since January 4, 2023.

Recent elections

2022

2020

2018

2016

2014

2012

2010

2008

2006

2004

2002

2000

1998

1996

1994

References

35